Hyloconis bicruris is a moth of the family Gracillariidae. It is found in China (Sichuan).

References

External links

Moths described in 2012
Endemic fauna of Sichuan
Lithocolletinae

Insects of China
Taxa named by Hou-Hun Li
Taxa named by Hai-Yan Bai